Ligorio Guindazzo served as bailli of the Principality of Achaea for Prince John of Gravina from June 1321 to October 1322. He arrived with military reinforcements, two hundred foot soldiers and some cavalry, but nothing else is known of his tenure.

References

Sources
 

14th-century Italian nobility
Baillis of the Principality of Achaea
14th-century people from the Principality of Achaea